The Kuopio Province was a province of Finland from 1831 to 1997. The province was named after its capital, city of Kuopio.

History 
The predecessor of province was the County of Savolax and Karelia, which was established in 1775 when Finland was integrated part of Sweden.

As a consequence of the tumultuous conflicts of the Napoleonic Wars, Sweden had allied itself with the Russian Empire, United Kingdom and the other parties of the Fourth Coalition against Napoleonic France. However, following the treaty of Treaty of Tilsit in 1807, Russia made peace with France and left the coalition. This enabled Russia in 1808 to challenge Sweden in the Finnish War, over the control of Finland. In the Treaty of Fredrikshamn on September 17, 1809 Sweden was obliged to cede all its territory in Finland, east of the Torne River, to Russia.

The ceded territories became a part of the Russian Empire and were reconstituted into the Grand Duchy of Finland, with the Russian Tsar as the Grand Duke. At first there wasn't any changes in the County of Savolax and Karelia, which was now a province in the autonomic Grand Duchy. Kuopio Province was established in 1831 from this province, while its southern parts were transferred to the new Mikkeli Province.

In 1960 the eastern part of the Kuopio province was separated as the Northern Karelia Province. In 1997 the province was reunited with Northern Karelia and together they merged with the Mikkeli Province, to establish the new Eastern Finland Province.

Maps

Municipalities in 1997 (cities in bold) 

 Iisalmi
 Juankoski
 Kaavi
 Karttula
 Keitele
 Kiuruvesi
 Kuopio
 Lapinlahti
 Leppävirta
 Maaninka
 Nilsiä
 Pielavesi
 Rautalampi
 Rautavaara
 Siilinjärvi
 Sonkajärvi
 Suonenjoki
 Tervo
 Tuusniemi
 Varkaus
 Varpaisjärvi
 Vehmersalmi
 Vesanto
 Vieremä

Former municipalities (disestablished before 1997) 
 Kuopion maalaiskunta
 Muuruvesi
 Pielisensuu
 Pälkjärvi
 Riistavesi
 Säyneinen

Governors 

 Lars Sackleen 1831–1833
 Gustaf Adolf Ramsay 1833–1854
 Berndt Federley 1854–1855
 Sten Knut Johan Furuhjelm 1855–1862
 Samuel Henrik Antell 1862–1866
 Johan August von Essen 1866–1873
 Carl Gustaf Mortimer von Kraemer 1873–1884
 August Alexander Järnefelt 1884–1888
 Johan Fredrik Gustaf Aminoff 1888–1899
 Henrik Åkerman 1899–1900
 Edvard Gabriel Krogius 1900–1903
 Martin Alexius Bergh (Martti Vuori) 1903–1905
 Emil Wilhelm Stenius 1905–1911
 Werner Nikolaus Tavaststjerna 1911–1913
 Arthur Spåre 1913–1917
 Albert von Hellens 1917–1918
 Gustaf Ignatius 1918–1940
 Pekka Heikkinen 1940–1950
 Lauri Riikonen 1950–1960
 Erkki O. Mantere 1960–1966
 Risto Hölttä 1966–1978
 Kauko Hjerppe 1978–1993
 Olavi Martikainen 1993–1997

See also
 State Provincial Office of Kuopio

References

Provinces of Finland (1917–97)
1831 establishments in the Russian Empire